The Lincoln Mountains is a mountain range in southeastern Alaska, United States, located on the Alaskan side of the Portland Canal between the Salmon River and the Soule River, near the community of Hyder. It has an area of 235 km2 and is a subrange of the Boundary Ranges which in turn form part of the Coast Mountains.

See also
List of mountain ranges

References

Boundary Ranges
Landforms of Prince of Wales–Hyder Census Area, Alaska
Mountains of Unorganized Borough, Alaska